Gar Waterman is a sculptor based in New Haven, Connecticut. He is notable for large public arts projects for public places and creations which mimic sealife.

He works in marble, stone, bronze, wood, and sometimes glass. Some of his very large sculptures resemble "giant insects welded together from scrap metal," according to one account.

He married his agent and arts organizer Thea Buxbaum in 1997. Waterman grew up in New Jersey and Maine and lived for a while in Tahiti. He is the youngest son of oceanographic filmmaker Stan Waterman and grew up "exploring the ocean depths". He graduated from Phillips Academy in 1974 and from Dartmouth in 1978.

References

External links
 

1956 births
artists from New Haven, Connecticut
Dartmouth College alumni
living people
people from Pietrasanta
Phillips Academy alumni
sculptors from Connecticut